Art Students' League of Philadelphia was a short-lived, co-operative art school formed in reaction to Thomas Eakins's February 1886 forced-resignation from the Pennsylvania Academy of the Fine Arts. Eakins taught without pay at ASL from 1886 until the school's dissolution in early 1893.

Loincloth incident

In early January 1886, Eakins, director of the art school at the Pennsylvania Academy of the Fine Arts, had a male model remove his loincloth during an anatomy lecture in front of either an all-female or a mixed male-and-female class of students. This was contrary to PAFA policy, and Eakins was reprimanded in a January 11 letter by Director of Education Edward Hornor Coates. But the incident ignited controversy, including charges that Eakins had cavorted nude with his students, had manipulated them into posing nude for him or for each other, had photographed them nude, and that he did not possess the moral character to be a teacher at PAFA.

Over the next month, Eakins's brother-in-law and teaching assistant, Frank Stephens, became the most vituperative critic. Stephens accused Eakins of indecent behavior with his students and even incest with his deceased sister, Margaret. Stephens and his wife (Eakins's sister Caddy) were living with her father at 1729 Mount Vernon Street. Eakins had married Susan Macdowell in January 1884, and they were living in his studio at 1330 Chestnut Street. The surviving documentation contains no accusation of homosexual activity by Eakins. Although another brother-in-law, Will Crowell, raised the possibility that Stephens himself had engaged in homosexual activity, and suggested that the threat of exposure could be used to silence him, "if he is not stark mad."

The incident and accusations against Eakins occurred at a time in which PAFA was facing financial challenges, and a new opportunity. PAFA had ended 1885 with a $6,000 deficit. In January 1886, the Estate of Joseph E. Temple proposed to contribute $25,000 toward establishing an endowment for the museum/school, with the condition that PAFA raise an additional $75,000 within three years.

Resignation
Coates wrote to Eakins on February 8, asking him to resign; Eakins submitted a one-sentence resignation the following day. Eakins continued to protest his innocence, and met with Coates on February 13. Coates presented the charges to PAFA's Board of Directors at a meeting that night, and the Board voted to accept Eakins's resignation. Eakins wrote to Coates on February 15:

Sympathy for Eakins built in the press, with multiple calls for him to be reinstated. Five PAFA instructors — Frank Stephens, Charles Stephens (Frank's first cousin), Colin Campbell Cooper, James P. Kelly, and Thomas Anshutz — wrote a joint letter to PAFA's Board appealing to it to make "an official statement" that "Mr. Eakins' dismissal was due to the abuse of his authority and not to the malice of his personal or professional enemies." The Board declined to do so. (Technically, the Board had accepted Eakins's letter of resignation, not dismissed him.)  Eakins continued to teach at PAFA into March, and tried to appeal his departure for more than a year, but to no avail. A more conservative curriculum was adopted at PAFA, and Anshutz, Kelly, and Charles Stephens were all promoted.

Philadelphia Sketch Club
Anshutz and both Stephenses took their accusations to the Philadelphia Sketch Club: "We hereby charge Mr. Thoms Eakins with conduct unworthy of a gentleman & discreditable to this organization & ask his expulsion from the club." A committee investigated, concluding that: "Eakins has used his position as an artist and his authority as a teacher to commit certain trespasses on common decency and good morals." His honorary membership in the club was revoked.

A front-page story in The Philadelphia Evening Item was headlined: "The End of Eakins," and a subsequent story asked, "does anyone imagine he [Eakins] will not sink into obscurity and leave the city?" Eakins's personal reputation was ruined, something from which he never totally recovered.

Protest
Fifty-five male PAFA students signed a February 15 petition threatening to withdraw from the school if Eakins was not reinstated. The female PAFA students also circulated a petition, that eighteen of the thirty signed. That evening, thirty-eight male students, led by George Reynolds, marched to Eakins's studio to show their support. Eakins had offered to teach them outside of PAFA, and they proposed forming their own school – The Art Students' League. But, "[o]nce the renegades fully understood they would be forgoing an education in the most respected and best outfitted art school in the country for a one-room studio without electricity and plumbing, only sixteen of the fifty-five who had signed the petition made good on their pledge to withdraw from the academy."

Those sixteen were: Albert W. Baker, Edward W. Boulton (ASL's second president), Charles Bregler, James J. Cinan, Charles Brinton Cox (ASL's first secretary), Eldon R. Crane, Alexander Duncan, Thomas J. Eagan, Charles F. Fewier, J. P. McQuaide, G. H. Merchant, Henry A. Nehmsmann, George Reynolds (ASL's first curator), Rudolph Spiel, James M. Wright, and August Zeller.

School

Temporary quarters at 1429 Market Street were secured, and "The League" held its first session on February 22, with about 30 students present. ASL's first president, H. T. Cresson, was quoted that day in a Philadelphia newspaper: "[T]he young men who have formed the Art Students' League ... desire to study THE ENTIRE NUDE FIGURE, not because it affords them pleasure to look at it, but because it is the only true way to obtain the necessary experience  to represent a draped figure ..."

Subsequent students, some of whom may have been there that first night, included Cresson, Maurice Feely, Charles H. Fromuth, Douglass M. Hall, Lilian G. Hammitt, Frank B. A. Linton, Edwin George Lutz, Albert Oldach (ASL's third secretary), Edmond T. Quinn (ASL's third curator), Franklin L. Schenck (ASL's second curator), Amelia Van Buren, and Francis J. Ziegler (ASL's treasurer and second secretary). Charles Grafly, made the move to ASL, but returned to PAFA the following year, perhaps to be eligible for its traveling scholarships to Europe, one of which he won in 1888. Seventeen-year-old Samuel Murray enrolled in Fall 1886, and eventually became Eakins's assistant and protégé.

Eakins set forth the school's purpose: "The Art Students' League of Philadelphia is an association formed for the study of painting and sculpture. The basis of study is the nude human figure." Tuition was initially set at $25, but it was raised to $40 for the 8-month 1886-87 season, and finally to $50. The school never had more than forty-one students, and sometimes had as few as twelve. "No antique or drawing classes were included; only painting and modelling from life. Eakins gave criticisms two mornings, one afternoon and one evening a week, delivered lectures on anatomy, perspective, and other subjects, and superintended the dissecting. For all this he refused to accept any salary during the years of the school's existence; indeed, he assisted some of the poorer students financially, often under the guise of paying them for posing for him."

ASL's first location was outgrown in only two months, and later demolished for Frank Furness's expansion of Broad Street Station. Its second location was at 1338 Chestnut Street (April 1886-May 1888), near Eakins's own studio. Its third location, 1816 Market Street (May 1888 – 1890), suffered a major fire, and its fourth and final location was at 12th & Filbert Street (1890–1893), above the Philadelphia Dental College.

The enterprise prospered into the early 1890s, but lost passion as the students who had been personally involved in the battles moved on. Art critic Dorothy Grafly Drummond wrote that, “the little band was fighting for its own bread and butter, at best thinly sliced and even more thinly spread.  With time, tradition proved more strong than the rebellion against it.” Eventually, the school could not attract enough paying students to cover expenses, and it was dissolved in early 1893.

Teaching elsewhere
Eakins taught elsewhere, concurrent with the Art Students' League of Philadelphia, and subsequent to it: Art Students' League of New York, 1885–1888; Cooper Union in New York City, 1887–1897; National Academy of Design in New York, 1888–1895; Art Students' League of Washington, D.C., 1893. Dismissed by Philadelphia's Drexel Institute in March 1895 for again using a fully nude male model, Eakins gradually gave up teaching.

Bregler Collection
Much of what is known of the Art Students' League of Philadelphia comes from Charles Bregler, who was a student for the school's whole 7-year existence. He remained a lifelong friend to Eakins and his wife, and wrote two lengthy articles in the 1930s about Eakins's teaching methods. He preserved an enormous trove of Eakins papers, memorabilia, and minor works, although it was unavailable to scholars until the 1980s. The Bregler Collection was bought by the Pennsylvania Academy of the Fine Arts in 1985.

The Bregler Collection papers have changed the general perception of Eakins's departure from PAFA. It is now seen as less of a case of Victorian authority (PAFA's Board) persecuting a heroic iconoclast (Eakins), and more as a conspiracy by his colleagues and personal enemies to engineer his ouster from PAFA and deliberately sabotage his reputation.

Eakins portraits of Art Students' League students

References
Henry Adams, Eakins Revealed (New York: Oxford University Press, 2005).
Charles Bregler, "Thomas Eakins as a Teacher." The Arts, vol. 17 (March 1931), pp. 376–86.
Charles Bregler, "Thomas Eakins as a Teacher, Second Article." The Arts, vol. 18 (October 1931), pp. 27–42.
Susan Danly and Cheryl Leibold, et al., Eakins and the Photograph (PAFA, Smithsonian Institution Press, 1994).
Kathleen A. Foster, Thomas Eakins Rediscovered (New Haven: Yale University Press, 1997).
Kathleen A. Foster and Cheryl Leibold, Writing About Eakins (Philadelphia: University of Pennsylvania Press, 1989).
Lloyd Goodrich, Thomas Eakins, His Life and Work (New York: Whitney Museum of American Art, 1933).
Gordon Hendricks, The Life and Work of Thomas Eakins (New York: Grossman Publishers, 1974).
Sidney D. Kirkpatrick, The Revenge of Thomas Eakins (New Haven: Yale University Press, 2006).
William S. McFeely, Portrait: The Life of Thomas Eakins (New York: W. W. Norton & Company, 2007).
Margaret McHenry, Thomas Eakins who painted (by the author, 1946).
Roland McKinney, Thomas Eakins (New York: Crown Publishers, 1942).
Phyllis D. Rosenzweig, The Thomas Eakins Collection of the Hirshhorn Museum and Sculpture Garden (Smithsonian Institution, 1977).
David Sellin, Thomas Eakins and His Fellow Artists at the Philadelphia Sketch Club (Philadelphia Sketch Club, 2001).
Theodor Siegl, The Thomas Eakins Collection (Philadelphia Museum of Art, 1978).

Notes

Art schools in Pennsylvania
American artist groups and collectives
Educational institutions established in 1886
Educational institutions disestablished in 1893
1886 establishments in Pennsylvania